Richard Beasley may refer to: 

 Richard Beasley (politician) (1761–1842), soldier, political figure, farmer and businessman from Upper Canada
 Richard Beasley (author) (born 1964), Australian author
 Richard Lee Beasley (1930–2012), American politician from South Carolina
 Richard Beasley (born 1959), American serial killer convicted of luring three men to their deaths via a Craigslist ad in 2011
 Richard Beasley (physician), New Zealand medical academic